The following is a list of academic institutions formerly affiliated to the University of Calcutta, in Kolkata, India:

Acharya Brojendra Nath Seal College
Armenian College
Barasat Government College
Bareilly College
Bengal Engineering College
Bengal Veterinary College
Bidhannagar College
Brajalal College
Calcutta National Medical College
Carmichael College, Rangpur
Chittagong College
Comilla Victoria College
Cotton College, Guwahati
Dhaka College
Govt. Azizul Haque College
Government College, Lahore
Hislop College, Nagpur
Holkar Science College, Indore
Thomason College of Civil Engineering
Indian Statistical Institute, Calcutta
Kumudini College, Tangail
Medical College Calcutta
Midnapore College
Mohammadan Anglo Oriental College
Mohindra College, Patiala
Morris College, Nagpur
Murari Chand College, Sylhet
Nawab Jassa Singh Ahluwalia Government College, Kapurthala (1857-1882) 
Nil Ratan Sarkar Medical College and Hospital
Presidency College, Kolkata
R. G. Kar Medical College and Hospital
Rajshahi College
Ravenshaw College, Cuttack
Royal College Colombo
St. Stephen's College, Delhi
Suri Vidyasagar College
Tripura Engineering College
Rangoon College

References 

 
formerly affiliated